The Desafio Internacional das Estrelas ("International Challenge of the Stars" in Portuguese) is an annual charity kart race organised by Felipe Massa since 2005. The first edition was held on Kartódromo Toca da Coruja on Bauru. For 2006 at 2008 the challenge was moved to Kartódromo dos Ingleses on Florianópolis and since 2009 at Arena Sapiens Park, also at Florianópolis.

Notably, top level Brazilian drivers have competed in the event, such as Felipe Massa, Bruno Senna, Rubens Barrichello, Tony Kanaan, Hélio Castroneves, Lucas di Grassi and Nelson Piquet Jr.  Also Brazilian drivers on the national championship such as Stock Car Brasil and Fórmula Truck. In addition, Brazilian motorcycle racer Alex Barros has competed. International drivers such as Jean Alesi and Robert Doornbos joined the Brazilian contingent in 2006, Vitantonio Liuzzi competed in 2006, 2008, 2009, 2011 and 2013, Michael Schumacher racing in 2007, 2008 and 2009, Luca Badoer joined in 2007 and 2008. Jeff Gordon participated in 2008, Jaime Alguersuari in 2010, 2011 and 2013, Jules Bianchi in 2011 and 2013, Adrian Sutil, Pastor Maldonado Jérôme d'Ambrosio and Gianni Morbidelli at 2011 participated in the competition. Fernando Alonso, Sébastien Buemi and Kamui Kobayashi all took part in the competition in 2013.

Scoring system

The score of each race is established as follows:

Pole position for race 1 race wins 2 points, at the end of two races, to ensure that the driver the score for their finishing position, he must complete a minimum of 75% of the laps completed by the leader. In the event of a tie, is used as tiebreaker the result obtained in first race.

Results

Winners

References

External links
 Desafio Internacional das Estrelas official website